The 2007–08 Second and Third Division Knock-Out (known as quick Keno Second and Third Division Knock-Out for sponsorship reasons) was a knockout tournament for Maltese football clubs playing in the Second and Third Division. The final was contested by defending champions, Balzan Youths and Melita, the latter winning 5–1.

Group stage

Group 1

Group 2

Group 3

Group 4

Group 5

Group 6

Group 7

Group 8

Knockout phase

See also 
 2007–08 Maltese Second Division
 2007–08 Maltese Third Division

Maltese Second and Third Division Knock-Out
knock-out